The Men's Keirin event at the 2010 South American Games was held on March 21.  The qualifications and repechage were held on the morning and the semifinals and finals on the evening.

Medalists

Results

First round

Heat 1

Heat 2

Repechage

Repechage 1

Repechage 2

Final

References
First Round
Final

Keirin M
Men's keirin